Raavi Narayana Reddy (5 June 1908 – 7 September 1991) was an Indian politician, a founding member of the Communist Party of India, and a peasant leader. He was a leader in the Telangana Rebellion against the rule of Osman Ali Khan, Asaf Jah VII. Reddy was also a philanthropist, social reformer, and parliamentarian. He is renowned in Telangana for fighting on behalf of peasants. Raavi Narayana Reddy also played a critical role in the Andhra Mahasabha as its chairman in 1941.

Post 1947 

In the 1952 Indian general election, Reddy stood for the People's Democratic Front, (a pseudonym for the banned Communist Party of India), and polled more votes than Jawaharlal Nehru and also the first one entering in the parliament in independent India.

An auditorium, the Raavi Narayana Reddy Memorial Auditorium Complex at Banjara Hills in Hyderabad, was built and named in his memory by the Telangana Martyrs' Memorial Trust.

In 2006, Chief Minister of Andhra Pradesh Y. S. Rajasekhara Reddy presented the Raavi Narayana Reddy memorial national foundation award to A. B. Bardhan, Communist Party of India general secretary.

References

External links 
 "Obituary Reference", Parliament of India; 11 September 1991. Retrieved 27 March 2011
 "Freedom Movement in Andhra Pradesh". Press Information Bureau, Government of India. Retrieved 27 March 2011
 Shri Ravi Narayan Reddy gari Interview by Telugu university (part of Telugu velugulu)
 Dr Ravi Narayana Reddy Freedom Fighter Interview by All India Radio

1908 births
1991 deaths
20th-century Indian philanthropists
Participants in the Telangana Rebellion
Telangana Rebellion
Indian independence activists from Telangana
India MPs 1962–1967
Communist Party of India politicians from Telangana